Queensberry House is a building of 17th-century origin which is now a Category A listed building. It stands on the south side of the Canongate, Edinburgh, Scotland, incorporated into the Scottish Parliament complex on its north-west corner. It contains the office of the Presiding Officer, two Deputy Presiding Officers, the Parliament's Chief Executive, and other staff.

History
The mansion house was built in 1681 for Charles Maitland, Lord Hatton. Archaeological excavations in advance of the building of the Scottish Parliament complex found evidence of metalworking in the kitchen, likely related to the assaying and refining of precious metals. Given that Lord Hatton was a Master of the Scottish Mint, the archaeologists have hypothesized that it may have been converted to a workshop to debase money from the Royal Mint. Previous domestic buildings on the site included two dwellings which the master of the king's wine cellar Jerome Bowie bought in 1581 from the family of a prominent stone mason, Gilbert Cleuch.

Maitland's house was bought by William Douglas, 1st Duke of Queensberry in 1686. He died in the house in 1695 and it then passed to his son, James Douglas, 2nd Duke of Queensberry, who was one of the Scottish peers signing the Treaty of Union in 1707. The public reaction to his involvement in the treaty was harsh, as it was seen as treasonous and self-serving (he received titles and monies for his involvement), and his house was attacked by the Edinburgh mob.

On his death in 1711 the house passed to his second son Charles Douglas who had been born in the house in 1698. His wife, Catherine, Duchess of Queensberry, was the patroness of the poet John Gay who visited several times.

With the opening of the New Town, many of the wealthy moved out of the area. The house ceased to be the principal residence of the dukes and was turned into rented accommodation. It was eventually sold to William Aitchison in 1801, who stripped the interior of all its fittings,  like wooden panelling and fine fireplaces.

From 1803 to 1996 the building was used as a hospital. This included a period during the cholera epidemic in the 1830s when it was specifically used as a cholera hospital.

In the 1850s it was a House of Refuge and Night Asylum, i.e. a lodging house for homeless persons and continued in this use until the Second World War. In 1945 it became a home for the elderly homeless on a more long-term basis for the individuals involved. It was acquired by the Scottish Government in 1997.

In popular culture

Ian Rankin's Inspector Rebus novel Set in Darkness, first published in 2000 is partly set in Queensberry House during the reconstruction for the new parliament building.

Ghost
The building is said to be haunted by the kitchen boy roasted and eaten by James Douglas, the mad Earl of Drumlanrig, in 1707.

References

External links 
Scottish Parliament Buildings

Houses completed in 1667
Category A listed buildings in Edinburgh
Scottish Parliament
Hospitals in Edinburgh
Defunct hospitals in Scotland
Houses in Edinburgh
Government buildings in Edinburgh
Architecture in Scotland
17th century in Scotland
Royal Mile
Reportedly haunted locations in Edinburgh
Listed government buildings in Scotland
Category A listed houses in Scotland
1667 establishments in Scotland